Le Claux is a commune in the Cantal department in south-central France. It is located in Auvergne, in the department of Cantal.

It is located in the Massif central, specifically in the monts du Cantal. Because of its location in between the mountains, snowfall is heavy, which has given it the nickname of "village de Neige" (French for "village of snow").

Population

See also
Communes of the Cantal department

References

Communes of Cantal
Cantal communes articles needing translation from French Wikipedia